Kaalamo is a rural locality in the Republic of Karelia, Russia. The settlement is located 35 kilometers north of Sortavala along the railway between Sortavala and Suojärvi. Its population is 1,300 (in 2008).  Before the Winter War and Continuation War, it used to be part of Finland.

References 

Rural localities in the Republic of Karelia